This is a list of ambassadors to Slovakia. Note that some ambassadors are responsible for more than one country while others are directly accredited to Bratislava.

Current ambassadors to Slovakia

See also

 Foreign relations of Slovakia
 List of diplomatic missions of Slovakia
 List of diplomatic missions in Slovakia

References

   List of diplomatic corp accredited to Slovakia

Slovakia